Eupithecia argentea is a moth in the family Geometridae. It is found in south-western China (Sichuan).

The wingspan is about 21 mm. The fore- and hindwings are off-white.

References

Moths described in 2004
argentea
Moths of Asia